Kirchberg an der Jagst is a town in the district of Schwäbisch Hall, in Baden-Württemberg, Germany. It is located on the river Jagst, 11 km northwest of Crailsheim.

The Second World War resistance member Friedrich Gustav Jaeger was born here.

Politics
Elections for the local council (Gemeinderat) in 2014:
 Unabhängige Wählervereinigung (Independent voters association): 7 seats
 Aktive Bürger (active citizens) 8 seats
 Unabhängige Grüne Liste (Independent green list) 5 seats

References

Schwäbisch Hall (district)
Württemberg